Maya Kenig is an Israeli film director, writer and actress. As a director, she is known for In the Shade of the Palm Tree (2018), The Bentwich Syndrome (2015), Off-White Lies (2011) and Top of the World (2005). Her films were awarded in many festivals worldwide.
As an editor, she is known for On the Spectrum(TV series, 2018), Uri and Ella (TV series 2016), Up the Wrong Tree (Feature film 2012) and Connected (TV series 2009).

She has written a script for a feature film, Milk, which was selected for the Berlinale Talent Market 2018 and won the VFF Talent Highlight Award.

As an actress she is known for A Round Trip (2018), You're Next (2016), A Strange Course of Events (2014), Up the Wrong Tree (2013) and Petah Tiqva (2007).

Childhood
Born in 1979 in Tel Aviv, Maya Kenig spent her early childhood in Germany. She came back to Israel with her family at 6 years old and later on as a teenager, began developing in films.

Career

Filmmaking
Kenig graduated with excellence the acclaimed art High school Alon and majored in literature and film. Her graduation film The Latchkey Kid (1997) won two prizes at the Jerusalem film Festival. In the army Maya served at a film unit, where she had the chance to practice filmmaking and specialized mainly on editing photographing and teaching.

In 2001 she studied filmmaking at The London Film School, where she made several shorts, One of them called Still water received a special mention note.
After one year of studies there she went back to Israel and started studying at the Sam Spiegel film school in Jerusalem.  Where she has made the film Top of the world  screened in many festivals around the world, and My Mom a short documentary that was screened at the Docaviv FF and was broadcast on TV in Israel.

In 2006 she has made the film In utero along with her partner in life Gur Bentwich, which has also become her professional partner in many projects. The film was screened at the Jerusalem FF, broadcast on TV and won the prize for best film at KIN International women's film Festival.

Off-White Lies (2011) is her first full-length feature film, it premiered at the Berlinale, and it was nominated for the Israeli academy awards in many categories, including for best film, script and directing. Gur Bentwich received the Best Actor award at the Jerusalem Film Festival 2011- for his role in the film.

In 2015 Maya created with Gur The Bentwich syndrome a 1-hour Documentary which won the Best Documentary Prize at the Jewish Motifs International Film Festival.

In 2018 she made In the Shade of the Palm tree” - a 15-minute short that was part of a compilation Voice Over,  curated by Renen Schorr.

As an editor
Alongside her film making, Maya also Established herself as an editor, worked on many different projects, both documentary and fiction, among them: Connected (a documentary TV Series), up the wrong tree (a praised feature by Gur Bentwich), On the spectrum (recently premiered in Tribeca Film Festival and won best TV series at Cinemania, France), Etgar Keret- what animal are you? (2012) 1 hour Documentary by Gur Bentwich, Uri an Ella 2016 TV Series (sold for remake the American network CBS).

Films

Off-White Lies
After years of living apart from her dad, Libby, an introverted yet sharp-witted teenager is sent to live with him in Israel.
Her arrival coincides with the outbreak of the second Lebanon war.
Libby quickly discovers that her Dad, Shaul, is an infantile eccentric, and that he is “in-between apartments” (in other words: homeless). Shaul comes up with a creative plan to put a roof over their heads- they pose as refugees from the bombarded northern region of Israel and are taken in by a well-off family in Jerusalem.
Finally in a “normal” household, Shaul and Libby begin to build their father- daughter relationship, but their false identities cannot last forever, especially as Libby unleashes teenage fury at the lies permeating her life; those she must tell now, and those she's been fed since childhood.

Milk
Tala (33), an offbeat musician who just gave birth to her first daughter, takes up a job at Milky Way, a dairy for mother's milk, where women sit in working-stations for their breasts to be pumped. The milk is distributed mainly to mothers who can't or don't want to breastfeed their babies but can afford fresh organic mother's milk – For nature knows best what's best for you. The need to earn a living and support her baby with no father in the picture has pushed Tala into this awkward job. 
Tala soon learns the house rules: 100% discretion, 1-year minimum commitment, 40-minute pumping sessions with 3-hour intervals, strict diet, no drinking, no drugs. The only consolation is the sisterhood woven between the women at the dairy – and of course the handsome paycheck. Everything would have worked out just fine if only Tala wasn't Tala- Even though she tries her best to accept her new role, her rebellious nature keeps pushing her to confrontations. A sneaky cigarette is detected in her blood tests and Tala is suspended from the factory. Upon hitching a ride home with the 'breast'-milkman, she accidentally meets the upper-class woman who receives her own milk, an encounter which leads her to a bumpy and surprising journey, in which she learns what it really means to be a mother.

On the Spectrum
A bittersweet comedy about three roommates, living together under one roof. All in their late-twenties, each diagnosed with a disorder on the autistic spectrum. Through their unique, surprising, and extremely un-PC perspective about relationships, family, work, friendship, sex and social conventions, we'll get to look at ourselves in a new, strange and funny way.

Filmography

Writer and director
 2018 - In the Shade of the Palm tree - Part of a compilation project by Renen Schorr
 2015 - The Bentwich syndrome 1-hour Documentary
Best Documentary Prize at the Warsaw Jewish motifs international Film Festival

 2011 - Off-White Lies, full-length feature film
Berlinale, Palm springs film Festival, Busan film Festival and more

Nominations for the Israeli academy awards including for best film, script and directing

Best Actor, Jerusalem Film Festival 2011- Gur Bentwich

Special Jury Prize- Annonay Festival 2013

Milos Macourek Award- Zlin FF Czech Republic

Was released in Israel, France, US and Russia

 2009 - The vow, a short Drama for an Israeli children's channel
 2008 - Co-creator with Gur Bentwich of  Around trip
winner of the short film Wolgin award at the Jerusalem Film Festival  
  
 2008 - Behind the scenes featurette for the stage production Fiddler on the roof at the Kameri theater
 2006 - Co-creator (script and direction) with Gur Bentwich of In utero, 36 min, fiction. 
Best short film award at the Kin women's international film festival

Jerusalem film Festival

The film was broadcast by the Israeli Satellite TV Provider Yes

 2006 - Behind the scenes featurette for the feature film Jellyfish by Etgar Keret & Shira Gefen, winner of Camera D'Or, Cannes Film Festival
 2005 - Top of the World, 16mm, fiction, 14 min.
Supported by The America-Israel Fund
The 11th International Student Film Festival, Tel-Aviv 

51st Cork Film Festival

Asia Short Film Festival, Seoul, Korea

26th Uppsala short film festival  
        
16th Annual Inside Out Toronto Film and Video Festival and many other festivals worldwide. The film My Mom, Documentary, 15 min.was broadcast on Channel 10

 2005 - My Mom
Doc-Aviv Documentary Film Festival 2005

The Rehovot Women's Festival 2005

Broadcast on the Israeli channels 2 and Yes

 2001- Queen of Dwarves, 16mm, documentary, 10 min.
 2000 - Still Water 16mm, fiction, 4 min.
Commendation – The London Film School

 1997 - The Latchkey Kid, Fiction, 13 min.
Best Script Award at the Wim Van Lir competition, Jerusalem Film Festival

Editor
 2018 - On the Spectrum TV Series
 2016 - Uri and Ella TV Series
 2014 - Drive's license TV series
 2012 - Etgar Keret- what animal are you? 1 hour Documentary by Gur Bentwich
 2012 - Up the wrong tree, full-length feature film by Gur Bentwich
 2009 - Connected, a documentary series for cable TV
 2008 - Freeland, 60 min. drama by Gur Bentwich
Best Drama Award at the Jerusalem Film Festival

 2008  - What About Me? a film by Etgar Keret & Shira Gefen, made for the UN

Actress
 2014 - Bekrov Etzlech (TV Series) - Sivan
Bali (2014),
Shira (2014),
Danny (2014),
Malki (2014),
Sivan (2014)

 2013 - Me'al Ha-giva - Orly
 2013 - Laredet meha-Etz
 2011 - Orhim Le-Rega
Libi's Mother (uncredited)

 2008 - Around Trip (Short) 
Joan Of Arc

 2007 - Petach Tikva (Short) 
Julian's Daughter

Prizes and festivals
 Maya's graduation film The Latchkey Kid, 1997 won two prizes at the Jerusalem film Festival
 Still water received a special mention note at The London film school
 Milk was at the Berlinale talent Market this year – 2018 and it won the VFF Talent Highlight Award.

Off-White Lies
Berlinale's Official Selection – Generation

Zlin FF Czech Republic – Miloš Macourek Award

Seret UK FF – World Cinema

Yerevan IFF Golden Apricot – Official Selection

Jerusalem IFF – Best Actor – Gur Bentwich

Filmforum Zadar FF – World Cinema

Saint-Petersburg IFF – Competition

São Paulo IFF – International Perspective

Moscow Israeli FF

Busan IFF – Flash Forward Selection

Melbourne and Sydney Jewish FF

UK Jewish FF

Gijon IFF – Enfants Terribles selection

Tallinn Black Nights FF – Just Film

Barbican Film Center

JCC London FF – World Cinema

Israeli FF – China

Israeli FF – Athens

Israeli FF – Hungary

Bratislava FF – World Cinema

Israeli FF – Belarus

Asian Pacific Screen Award – Best Children's film

Palm Springs IFF – New Voices / New Visions

Kiev Molodist FF – Israeli Week – Ukraine

References

External links
 An Interview with Maya Kenig at The New York Times.

1979 births
Living people
People from Tel Aviv
Israeli film directors
Israeli writers
Israeli television actresses
Alumni of the London Film School